Misan Haldin (born 7 July 1982 as Eyinmisan Edward Ogharanemeye Nikagbatse) is a German former basketball player. He played for clubs in Germany, Greece and Italy.

Professional career
Haldin started his professional career at TuS Lichterfelde Berlin, then a farm team of ALBA Berlin. At the 2000 international Albert Schweitzer Youth Tournament, he was the best scorer overall. Haldin signed a contract with ALBA, but did not play for them as he wanted to play for a top club on a European level. After nearly one year without playing in any official game, he signed with Olympiacos Piraeus. After playing for the Italian club Snaidero Udine for half a year, Haldin returned to Germany to play for Mitteldeutscher, with which he won the EuroCup Challenge. He was automatically eligible for the 2004 NBA Draft, but was not drafted.

Haldin then moved to Italy again, playing for Sedima Roseto and Vertical Vision Cantù in the first division. At the beginning of 2006, he signed for second division club Premiata Montegranaro, with which he got promoted to the first division. Haldin returned to Germany, but was waived by the Köln 99ers in March 2008, after testing positive on THC, although he was not officially suspended as he did not play during that time due to an injury. Another spell in Italy followed, this time playing for Pallacanestro Varese and winning the Legadue championship. He returned to professional sports in 2011, when he was acquired by the LTi Gießen 46ers. However, he was again waived during the season.

National team career
Haldin won the bronze medal as a member of the senior German squad at the 2002 FIBA World Championship, dunking over Yao Ming during the competition. He also took part in the EuroBasket 2005, winning the silver medal. The German national team's head coach, Dirk Bauermann, cut his name off the roster for the 2008 Olympics qualification, after his drug abuse incident
.

Personal life
He was born in Berlin(Germany) to Nigerian dad and Finnish mom, and his sister Roli-Ann is a member of the German women's national team. In 2012, they adopted their mother's name, Haldin.

References 

1982 births
Living people
Basketball players from Berlin
2002 FIBA World Championship players
Alba Berlin players
German men's basketball players
German people of Finnish descent
German sportspeople of Nigerian descent
Giessen 46ers players
Greek Basket League players
Köln 99ers players
Mitteldeutscher BC players
Olympiacos B.C. players
Pallalcesto Amatori Udine players
Pallacanestro Cantù players
Pallacanestro Varese players
Point guards
Roseto Sharks players
Sutor Basket Montegranaro players
German expatriate basketball people in Italy
German expatriate basketball people in Greece